Silver Heads is a 1998 Russian science fiction film directed by Yevgeny Yufit.

Plot
Scientists begin to conduct a secret experiment, the purpose of which is to study the interaction of man and tree in the course of their interfusion — through the fusion of human and tree molecules. The conceived experiment is far-fetched, but the result, which scientists expect to get, is very tempting — the man-tree will be stable with respect to the aggressive environment, durable, very unpretentious ...

A small group of scientists is sent to a remote forest range, who want to be both researchers and experimental participants. However, the forest is not deserted, as scientists thought. Firstly, there lives a forester with his family (wife and son) and a dog. Secondly, strange creatures wander through the forest, left here after a previous phantasmagorical experiment.

Cast
Tatiana Verkhovskaya
Vasily Deryagin
Valery Krishtapenko
Nikolai Marton
Vladimir Maslov
Alexander Polovtsev
Sergey Chernov
Daniil Zinchenko

References

External links

1990s science fiction comedy-drama films
Russian science fiction comedy-drama films
Russian black comedy films
1990s black comedy films
1990s Russian-language films